Cameron Evans is a Welsh professional footballer who plays as a defender for Taunton Town. His previous clubs are Swansea City, Waterford and Sligo Rovers.

Club career

Swansea City
Evans is a product of the Swansea City academy and he signed his first professional contract in July 2019 for one year. Cameron Evans made his senior debut for Swansea City on 9 January 2021 in the starting line up for the 2–0 FA Cup third round win against Stevenage. He was released by Swansea City at the end of his contract on 30 June 2022.

Waterford loan
On 21 February 2021, it was announced that Evans had signed for League of Ireland Premier Division side Waterford on a season long loan, ahead of the 2021 season under new manager Kevin Sheedy. He made his debut for the club in the opening game of the season on 19 March 2021, as his side lost 1–0 away to newly promoted side Drogheda United. On 27 August 2021, Evans scored his first goal in senior football in the Second Round of the FAI Cup in a 4–1 win over non league side Kilnamanagh. Evans made a total of 35 appearances in all competitions for the club as they were relegated to the League of Ireland First Division.

Sligo Rovers
Evans signed for League of Ireland Premier Division club Sligo Rovers on 10 August 2022.

Taunton Town
Evans joined National League South side Taunton Town on a six-month contract on 22 January 2023.

International career
Evans is a Wales under-19 international.

Personal life
He is the younger brother of professional footballer Jack Evans.

Career statistics

References

External links
 

2001 births
Living people
Association football defenders
Welsh footballers
Swansea City A.F.C. players
Wales youth international footballers
League of Ireland players
Waterford F.C. players
Sligo Rovers F.C. players
Expatriate association footballers in the Republic of Ireland